Sweet F.A. is an Australian generational game show currently in pre-production. Based in Brisbane,  Sweet F.A. utilises local and interstate talent in its casting and crew. Each episode involves two teams from different generations competing in question, physical, and visual games. At the end of the season, the two leading teams return to compete for the winning title.

The programme's title is derived from the euphemistic slang term, meaning "nothing". The use of modern slang in the title directly reflects the programme's quirky, youthful style. The tagline "It's all they have in common" directly relates to this title, and refers to the generation gap: the many social differences between the generations.

Controversy 
Sweet F.A. has encountered some controversy because of its conceptual similarities to Channel Ten's Talkin' 'Bout Your Generation. While both programs share the same format, Sweet F.A. has combined use of celebrity and regular guests, which gives the general public a chance to represent their own generation.

Casting 
Sweet F.A. is set to be hosted by Robin Bailey from 97.3 FM radio in Brisbane.

Generational teams on Sweet F.A. are made up of three contestants, usually including two local celebrity guests, and one member of the general public. Sweet F.A. often holds open contestant calls for individuals over 18 through their Facebook page, and is currently looking for both talent and general public contestants.

See also 
List of Australian television series

References

External links 
Sweet F.A. official Facebook group
Sweet F.A. official Youtube channel

2000s Australian television series
Australian game shows
Australian panel games
Upcoming television series
Television game shows with incorrect disambiguation